Ruben Armand "Benny" Mardones (November 9, 1946 – June 29, 2020) was an American pop/rock singer and songwriter who was best known for his hit single "Into the Night", which hit the top 20 on the Billboard Hot 100 chart twice, in 1980 (#11) and again in 1989 (#20).

Early life and career 
Benny Mardones was born on November 9, 1946, in Cleveland, Ohio. His father, Ruben Sr., who was originally from Santiago, Chile, left the family when Benny was an infant and returned to Chile. Mardones had a sister, two half-brothers, and two half-sisters who live in Chile.

Mardones grew up in Savage, Maryland, and graduated from Howard High School in Ellicott City, Maryland in 1964.  He joined the U.S. Navy after high school and served in the Vietnam War. After his discharge, he moved to New York City to pursue his singing and songwriting career, and composed several songs with writing partner Alan Miles.

Mardones began his career as a songwriter, writing songs for people like Brenda Lee and Chubby Checker. He demoed the songs he wrote, and Tommy Mottola suggested that he record his own songs; from that point he wrote and recorded over 100 songs.  Mardones's band was called the Hurricanes.

Into the Night 

Mardones co-wrote the 1980 soft rock hit "Into the Night" with Robert Tepper. The track was featured on his second album Never Run, Never Hide, and peaked at #11 on the Billboard Hot 100 and went platinum. Its success catapulted Mardones into the limelight, but he spiraled into substance abuse that resulted in his being dropped by his label Polydor Records. Though he eventually overcame his addiction, Mardones produced no other hits during his career.

In a TV interview on KTLA a while before his death, Mardones recalled how the song was inspired by a conversation between him and co-author Robert Tepper, after seeing a 16-year-old neighbour take Benny's dog for a walk. In the real life scene, there was no romantic link. (YouTube video)

"Into the Night" charted a second time in 1989 when Phoenix, Arizona radio station KZZP ran a segment titled "Where Are They Now?", and Scott Shannon, then-program director for Pirate Radio in Los Angeles, added "Into the Night" to its playlist. Other stations across the country followed suit and "Into the Night" was a hit once more, peaking at #20 on the Billboard Hot 100. Curb Records signed Mardones and he recorded "Into the Night '89", The track appeared on his self-titled release that year.

Personal life and death 
On October 4, 2011, Mardones married his third wife, Jane Braemer, who was originally from Denmark. Together, they resided in Menifee, California. Mardones had a son, Michael (born 1985), from a previous marriage.

Mardones was diagnosed with Parkinson's disease in 2000, but continued to tour and perform until the mid-2010s. In July 2018, he underwent deep brain stimulation to reduce his motor symptoms, but complications from multiple surgeries resulted in coordination issues that led to repeated falls and hip injuries. He died at age 73 from complications of the disease on June 29, 2020.

Discography

Studio albums 
1978: Thank God for Girls
1980: Never Run, Never Hide
1981: Too Much to Lose
1985: Unauthorized
1986: American Dreams (Benny Mardones & the Hurricanes)
1989: Benny Mardones
1993: The Lost Tapes
1996: Stand By Your Man
1998: Bless a Brand New Angel
2002: A Journey Through Time
2006: Let's Hear It for Love
2015: Timeless (Benny Mardones & the Hurricanes)

Live albums 
2007: Turning Stone Live 2006
2008: Extended Versions (Live)
2008: Turning Stone Live 2007
2009: Turning Stone Live 2008
2010: Turning Stone Live 2009

Extended plays 
1980: Live Sides
1985: Unauthorized
2013: The Lost Tapes

Singles

See also 
 1980s One-hit wonders in the United States

References

External links 

[ Allmusic]
Official MySpace site
Fan site
HIM Online Magazine Interview
Interview with Benny Mardones
 
 

1946 births
2020 deaths
American pop rock singers
Songwriters from Ohio
Musicians from Syracuse, New York
People from Savage, Maryland
Musicians from Cleveland
American people of Chilean descent
Songwriters from Maryland
Songwriters from New York (state)
Singers from Maryland
Hispanic and Latino American musicians
20th-century American male singers
20th-century American singers
21st-century American male singers
21st-century American singers
Neurological disease deaths in California
Deaths from Parkinson's disease
Polydor Records artists
Curb Records artists